The Ministry of National Economy is central executive body of the Government of Kazakhstan, which administers in the areas of strategic planning, tax and budgetary policies, as well as customs policy, state and state-guaranteed borrowing and debt, public-private partnerships, state investment projects, protection of competition and restriction of monopolistic activities, natural monopolies and regulated markets, international economic and financial relations.

The Ministry is also responsible for regulating international economic integration, regulating and developing foreign trade activities, regulating trade activities, managing public assets, including improving the quality of corporate governance, developing the public administration system, developing public policies in the provision of public services, mobilization training and mobilization, population migration, state material reserve.

History
The state body was originally established in January 1993 as the Ministry of Economy. The Ministry of Economy and Budget Planning was formed on 28 August 2002 in accordance with the Decree 931 by the President of Kazakhstan "On Measures to Further Improve the Public Administration of the Republic of Kazakhstan" by merging the functions of economic planning from the Ministry of Economy and Trade and budget planning from the Ministry of Finance. On 16 January 2013, the Ministry of Economic Development and Trade in accordance with the Decree of the President of the Republic of Kazakhstan "On further improvement of the public administration system of the Republic of Kazakhstan" was reorganized into the Ministry of Economy and Budget Planning. On 6 August 2014, during the reorganization, the Ministry of National Economy replaced the Ministry of Economy and Budget Planning of Kazakhstan and the Ministry of Regional Development of Kazakhstan, it also includes the functions of the reorganized agencies: statistics, regulation of natural monopolies, protection of competition, protection of consumer rights.

Departments 

 Department of Summary and Analytical Work (Secretariat of the Minister)
 Department of State Support for Entrepreneurship
 Information Protection Department
 Human Resources Department
 Department of Information Technology
 Department of Social Policy and Development of State Bodies
 Investment Policy Department
 Project Management Department
 Department of Analysis and Assessment of Regions
 Regional Development Department
 Department of Internal Administration
 Public Relations Department
 Legal Department
 Department of Public Administration System Development
 Entrepreneurship Development Department
 Trade Regulation Department
 Foreign Trade Development Department
 Department of State Assets Management Policy
 Department of International Economic Integration
 Department of International Cooperation
 Department of Government Commitments Management Policy and Financial Sector Development
 Department of Development of Sectors of the Economy
 Department of Strategic Planning and Analysis
 Department of Economics and Finance
 Department of budgetary policy
 Department of Tax and Customs Policy
 Department of Macroeconomic Analysis and Forecasting
 Internal Audit Department

Committees 

 Committee of Statistics
 Committee for Regulation of Natural Monopolies, Protection of Competition and Consumer Rights

Subordinate organizations 

 Information and Computing Center of the Agency on Statistics

Ministers

References

1993 establishments in Kazakhstan
National Economy
Ministries established in 1993